Euphaedra nigrocilia, the brighter Ceres forester, is a butterfly in the family Nymphalidae. It is found in eastern Nigeria. The habitat consists of drier forests in the savanna transition zone.

Similar species
Other members of the Euphaedra ceres species group q.v.

References

Butterflies described in 1903
nigrocilia
Endemic fauna of Nigeria
Butterflies of Africa